The 1978-79 NBA season was the Bulls' 13th season in the NBA.

Draft picks

Roster

Regular season

Season standings

z - clinched division title
y - clinched division title
x - clinched playoff spot

Record vs. opponents

Awards and records
Reggie Theus, NBA All-Rookie Team 1st Team
Artis Gilmore, NBA All-Star Game

References

Chicago Bulls seasons
Chicago
Chicago Bulls
Chicago Bulls